Pandoraea norimbergensis is a Gram-negative, non-spore-forming bacterium of the genus Pandoraea, with a single polar flagellum, which was isolated from an oxic water layer which had a sulfide containing sediment below in Nuremberg, Germany. Pandoraea norimbergensis has the ability to oxidate heterotrophic sulfur under slightly alkaline conditions.

References

External links
Type strain of Pandoraea norimbergensis at BacDive—the Bacterial Diversity Metadatabase

Burkholderiaceae
Bacteria described in 1998